The Chonhar Peninsula (Çonğar) is a peninsula in the northern part of Syvash.  

Administratively, the whole peninsula houses the Chonhar rural community of Henichesk Raion. Together with the reaching towards it from the Crimean peninsula , the Chonhar Peninsula divides Syvash into two parts: eastern and western. 

The Chonhar Peninsula, while part of Kherson province, is connected by numerous bridges and causeways dams with the Crimean Peninsula. Along with the Perekop Isthmus and the Arabat Spit, the Chonhar Peninsula boasts one of the three road connections between Crimea and mainland Europe.

History 
Chonhar Peninsula is occupied by Russian forces in course of Russo-Ukrainian War.

References 

Geography of Kherson Oblast
Peninsulas of Ukraine